Kiltubrid GAA is a Gaelic Athletic Association Gaelic football club in Kiltubrid, County Leitrim, Ireland.

Kilrubrid was originally founded on April 21st 1889, and was refounded 30th Jan 1978. The club has won the Leitrim Senior Football Championship once in 2005 beating Bornacoola  on a scoreline of 4-11 to 0-07. They were runners up in 2007 losing to St. Mary's Kiltoghert.

Kiltubrid currently compete in the Leitrim Intermediate Football Championship.

Honours

References

External links
 Kiltubrid GAA Website

Gaelic games clubs in County Leitrim
Gaelic football clubs in County Leitrim